Elmo Kassin (born 13 October 1969) is an Estonian cross-country skier. He competed at the 1992 Winter Olympics, the 1994 Winter Olympics and the 1998 Winter Olympics.

References

External links
 

1969 births
Living people
Estonian male cross-country skiers
Olympic cross-country skiers of Estonia
Cross-country skiers at the 1992 Winter Olympics
Cross-country skiers at the 1994 Winter Olympics
Cross-country skiers at the 1998 Winter Olympics
People from Otepää
20th-century Estonian people